Bhopal Municipal Corporation (BMC) is the Municipal Corporation for the capital city of Madhya Pradesh. It is responsible for the civic infrastructure and administration of the city of Bhopal. BMC administers an area of 463 km2 (250.29 sq mi). BMC is headed by Kolsani V.S. Choudhary (IAS) as the Commissioner and Alok Sharma as the Mayor. In August 2014, the corporation became one of India’s first municipal corporations to automate citizen services, working with German software company SAP SE for the purpose.

Overview
The total area under BMC is 463 km2 (250.29 sq mi). The city is divided into 85 wards. Each ward elects a corporator. The winning party elects a council of members, who are responsible for various departments. The council members chose the Mayor among themselves. At present, there are ten members in the council. The Commissioner of Bhopal is the highest officer of Municipal Corporate Office, which is responsible for the departments of public works, revenue and tax, water supply, planning and development, fire brigade, health and sanitation, finance and accounts etc. The current Municipal Commissioner of Bhopal is Kolsani V.S. Choudhary (IAS) while the current Mayor is Alok Sharma.

History
Majlis-e-intezamia was the name of first municipal body of Bhopal, which came into being in 1907 in the erstwhile Bhopal State. First city survey was conducted in 1916 after the enactment of Municipal Act. Up to 1956 the area under Bhopal Municipal limit was very small, but after that few more surrounding villages were added to it. The total area under Bhopal municipal limit reached to 71.23 km2 by 1975.

The Municipal Board was constituted for the first time in 1952 with Shri. Abdul Karim Babu Miya as president and Shri. Deendayal as vice-president.
Later on the status of Municipal board was upgraded to municipal council & an IAS officer was appointed as Chief Administrator. In 1983, Bhopal Municipal Council got the status of Municipal Corporation, with total 56 wards and Dr. R.K.Bisaria of Congress was elected as the first mayor.

Corporation election 2015

Political performance in election 2015

Departments

Public Works
Revenue & Tax
Heritage Cell 	 
Garden
Public Relation 	 
Water Supply
Planning & Development 	 
General Administration
Fire Services 	 
Health & Sanitation
Finance
e-Governance

Revenue sources 

The following are the Income sources for the Corporation from the Central and State Government.

Revenue from taxes  
Following is the Tax related revenue for the corporation.

 Property tax.
 Profession tax.
 Entertainment tax.
 Grants from Central and State Government like Goods and Services Tax.
 Advertisement tax.

Revenue from non-tax sources 

Following is the Non Tax related revenue for the corporation.

 Water usage charges.
 Fees from Documentation services.
 Rent received from municipal property.
 Funds from municipal bonds.

See also

 List of municipal corporations in India

References

External links 
 

Organisations based in Bhopal
Municipal corporations in Madhya Pradesh
1907 establishments in India